Holme Pierrepont is a hamlet and civil parish located  south-east of the city of Nottingham in Nottinghamshire, England. It is in the Gamston ward of the Rushcliffe local authority in the East Midlands region. The population of the civil parish (including Bassingfield) as at the 2011 Census was 528.

The word "Holme" comes from the Old English and Old Norse words for a small island or low-lying land by a river. "Pierrepont" is French for "Stone Bridge" and is the surname of an Anglo-Norman family that once held the manor.

National Water Sports Centre 

The National Water Sports Centre was purpose-built to facilitate the training of elite athletes and the holding of National and International competitions primarily in the disciplines of rowing and both white water and placid water kayaking/canoeing, although it is used to run many other activities.

The National Water Sports Centre is currently owned by Nottinghamshire County Council and leased to Sport England. As part of the re-profiling of National Centres, Sport England did not continue to fund the National Water Sports Centre after its management contract ended in 2009.

Holme Pierrepont Hall 

Holme Pierrepont Hall is a Grade I listed medieval hall. The hall was built by Sir William Pierrepont around 1500, and inhabited by subsequent generations of the Pierrepont family.

History 
There is evidence that Holme Pierrepont was settled by farming communities at least as long ago as the Neolithic era.  Archaeological remains from the Bronze Age, Iron Age and Roman period have been found in the parish.

The main historic features of Holme Pierrepont are the Church of St Edmund and Holme Pierrepont Hall.

1086 – the place comprised a mill,  of meadow, and was worth £6
1257 – Sir Henry Pierrepont marries Annora de Manvers, heir to Holme, and the name Pierrepont becomes attached to the hamlet
1628 – Sir Robert Pierrepont created Earl of Kingston-upon-Hull by King Charles I
1715 – Evelyn Pierrepont created Duke of Kingston-upon-Hull by King George I
1940 – Holme Pierrepoint Estate broken up and sold
1960 – Proposed power station
 1971 – Holme Pierrepont National Watersports Centre opens

Holme Pierrepoint power station 
In 1960 the Central Electricity Generating Board put forward a proposal to build a 2,000 MW power station on a 525 acre (213 ha) site at Holme Pierrepoint. The site was convenient for coal supplies delivered by rail; for the availability of cooling water from the Trent; and could be conveniently linked to the nearby national grid. Most conspicuous on the site were two chimneys 600 ft (183 m) high and 8 cooling towers each 375 feet (114 m) high. The site was large enough for a second 2,000 MW station, making potentially a total of 4 chimneys and 16 cooling towers. A Public Inquiry was held over 14 days in 1960. The Inquiry inspector rejected the proposal on the basis of being in conflict with proposed green belt; depressing property values; adding to traffic congestion; and preventing access to sand and gravel deposits. The Minister of Power, Richard Wood, announced he would reject the proposal.

Geography 
Nearby places include:
Bassingfield
Gamston
Adbolton
Radcliffe on Trent
West Bridgford
Colwick
Nottingham

Bus service
Holme Pierrepont has only one bus service which terminates at the Holme Pierrepont National Watersports Centre which only runs on Sundays and Bank Holidays, and is run by Nottingham City Transport.

References

External links
Holme Pierrepont & Gamston Parish Council website
History of Holme Pierrepont

Hamlets in Nottinghamshire
Civil parishes in Nottinghamshire
Rushcliffe